The Theodore Parker Lukens House is a historic house, located at 267 North El Molino Avenue, in Pasadena, California. Built in 1886–87, the house is among the oldest standing in Pasadena. Architect Harry Ridgway designed the Victorian house; while its design is mainly influenced by the Stick and Eastlake subtypes, it also includes elements of the Queen Anne style. The house features multiple deep gables and gabled dormers with decorative stickwork hanging from the edges. The two-story front porch is supported by decorative posts and features patterned bargeboards above the first floor designed to resemble curtains.

Background
The house's first owner, Theodore Parker Lukens, was a prominent horticulturalist and local real estate dealer. Lukens was a charter member of the Sierra Club and a friend of naturalist John Muir, and he was responsible for many of the club's early activities in Southern California. Lukens also led California's first attempts at reforestation in the 1890s.

The house was added to the National Register of Historic Places on March 29, 1984.

Gallery

References

Houses in Pasadena, California
Houses completed in 1887
Houses on the National Register of Historic Places in California
Buildings and structures on the National Register of Historic Places in Pasadena, California
Stick-Eastlake architecture in California
Victorian architecture in California